The Kidwelly Industrial Museum focuses on the tinplate industry in Kidwelly, as well as area coal mining and brick making. The museum is located near the town of Kidwelly, Carmarthenshire, West Wales, on the site of the former Kidwelly Tinplate Works. The tinplate works was originally established in 1737 and was closed in 1941.

The engine house of the tinplate works was listed as Grade II* in 1998 while the works chimney, boxing room and assorting room are listed as Grade II.

References

External links
 Kidwelly Industrial Museum Trust website
 Carmarthenshire County Council official page

Museums in Carmarthenshire
Industry museums in Wales
Industrial Museum